The 2022 China Tour was the fourth season of the China Tour to carry Official World Golf Ranking points.

Schedule
The following table lists official events during the 2022 season.

Order of Merit
The Order of Merit was based on prize money won during the season, calculated in Renminbi. The leading player on the tour (not otherwise exempt) earned status to play on the 2023 European Tour.

Notes

References

External links

2022 in golf
2022 in Chinese sport